Michael Londerigan (4 December 1879 – 3 January 1938) was an Australian rules footballer who played with Essendon in the Victorian Football League (VFL).

Notes

External links 

1879 births
1938 deaths
Australian rules footballers from Melbourne
Essendon Football Club players
People from North Melbourne